Pannalal Girdharlal Dayanand Anglo-Vedic (P.G.D.A.V) College is a constituent college of University of Delhi. Established in 1957, it offers various courses at the undergraduate, postgraduate level and open schooling.

P.G.D.A.V College is a South Campus college of Delhi University. The College is situated in Nehru Nagar, near Lajpat Nagar, in New Delhi. The College complex has two seminar halls, a Computer Centre, a Bank, a library, laboratories, and playgrounds for Cricket, Football, Badminton, Basketball and Volleyball. But now ground is given to cricket academy and students are restricted to play in the ground and students cannot sit in the field. It's canteen is supposed to be the biggest canteen in all Delhi University colleges.

Departments 
The college has twelve Departments which conduct B.Sc. / B.A. / B.Com. Honors as well as B.Sc. / B.A. / B.Com. Programme Courses.

List of Departments:

 Commerce
 Computer Science
 Economics
  English
 Hindi
 History
 Statistics
 Mathematics
 Physical Education
 Environmental Studies
 Political Science
 Sanskrit

Cultural societies of morning shift
 "Hyperion". It resembles the cultural diversity in its structure, being composed of multiple different societies, including: 
 Information Technology Society: "Tech-Wiz" was established in year 2013. Members of Tech-Wiz deals with all technical projects for P.G.D.A.V. College.
 The Photography Society: "IRIS- The Film and Photography Society"
 The Theatre and Film Making Society: "Navrang" has been awarded with the P.G.D.A.V Society of the year award for its amazing performance during the year 2016–17. Its most famous play "JAN-E-MAN" won 32 awards in total across delhi and also won 1st prize at Mood Indigo –The annual cultural fest of IIT Bombay. It also won best production award at Sahitya Kala Parishad's annual theatre fest.
 Dramatics Society: "Rudra" with its famous street play "YEH GANDI BAAT HAI" won the prize for the best play at 2012 IIT MUMBAI festival – Mood Indigo, second best play at Kamla Nehru college, 3rd best play at Dyal Singh evening college, best play at Jamia Millia Islamia and second best play at Faculty of Management Studies. The Society came into controversy with its play 'Dilli Desh Hai' in 2011 pointing out the flaws in federal funding structure of India, which focused on metros and big cities at cost of smaller cities and towns.
"Rapbeats"-"The Hip Hop Music Society" is the only Hip Hop Music Society in the whole of Delhi University.
 "Impressions": the impact on the cultural arts society, which is responsible for decoration in all the events held within the College major or minor be it the cultural fest or freshers talent hunt.
 Indian Music Society: "Raagaa"
 Dance Society: "SPUNK" – morning   "RIEVA" – evening 
 Intellectual Society: "Chanakya" The Intellectual Society is one of the prominent societies of Hyperion, which in itself holds 4 different societies, including:
 The Grey Matter: Debating Society As the name resembles it means matters which cannot be classified under the stereotyped 'black' or white and holds debatable aspects
 Buzzer: (Quiz Society)
 Qaafiya: A poetry forum was started in the year 2011.
 Western Music Society: "Conundrum" secured the first prize in the college band competition at Mood Indigo 2013 (IIT Bombay) apart from having won prizes at many other colleges including Kirori Mal College, Faculty of Law (Delhi), Dyal Singh College, SGND Khalsa College and JIMS (Rohini) the very same year.

Notable alumni

 Manoj Prabhakar – Former cricketer
 Dheeraj Verma – Comic book artist/creator
 Arvind Babbal – Director and producer
 Vijay Raaz – Actor
 Parvinder Awana – Cricketer
 Mukund Kumar IAS 2020 Batch

See also 

 Arya Samaj
Education in India
Literacy in India
List of institutions of higher education in Delhi

References

External links
Official College Website

Universities and colleges in Delhi
Universities and colleges affiliated with the Arya Samaj
1957 establishments in Delhi
Educational institutions established in 1957